Stenalcidia is a genus of moths in the family Geometridae.

Species
Stenalcidia biniola Dognin, 1900
Stenalcidia binotata (Warren, 1907)
Stenalcidia cariaria (Schaus, 1897)
Stenalcidia castaneata Warren, 1907
Stenalcidia celosoides (Dognin, 1895)
Stenalcidia cervinifusa Dognin, 1906
Stenalcidia congruata (Walker, 1863)
Stenalcidia constipata Dognin, 1908
Stenalcidia contempta Prout, 1931
Stenalcidia conveniens Dognin, 1907
Stenalcidia cretaria Bastelberger, 1908
Stenalcidia curvifera Dognin, 1906
Stenalcidia defimaria (Guenee, 1858)
Stenalcidia delgada (Dognin, 1895)
Stenalcidia despecta Prout, 1910
Stenalcidia dimidiaria (Guenee, 1858)
Stenalcidia dukinfieldia (Schaus, 1897)
Stenalcidia elongaria (Snellen, 1874)
Stenalcidia farinosa Warren, 1897
Stenalcidia fumibrunnea Warren, 1904
Stenalcidia fusca Warren, 1897
Stenalcidia gofa (Dognin, 1895)
Stenalcidia grisea Warren, 1900
Stenalcidia guttata Warren, 1904
Stenalcidia illaevigata (Maassen, 1890)
Stenalcidia illineata Dognin, 1906
Stenalcidia inclinataria (Walker, 1860)
Stenalcidia invenusta Dognin, 1904
Stenalcidia junctilinea (Warren, 1901)
Stenalcidia lacra (Dognin, 1895)
Stenalcidia latimedia Warren, 1904
Stenalcidia mergiata (Felder Rogenhofer, 1875)
Stenalcidia micaya Dognin, 1900
Stenalcidia nigrilineata Dognin, 1900
Stenalcidia nitens Warren, 1906
Stenalcidia odysiata (Snellen, 1874)
Stenalcidia pallida Dognin, 1918
Stenalcidia pergriseata Warren, 1901
Stenalcidia perstrigata (Warren, 1897)
Stenalcidia piperacia Dognin, 1912
Stenalcidia plenaria (Walker, 1860)
Stenalcidia plexilinea Dognin, 1909
Stenalcidia plumosa (Warren, 1904)
Stenalcidia praeparata Prout, 1910
Stenalcidia pseudocculta Dognin, 1900
Stenalcidia pulverosa Warren, 1897
Stenalcidia quisquiliaria (Guenee, 1857)
Stenalcidia robusta (Warren, 1901)
Stenalcidia roccaria (Oberthur, 1883)
Stenalcidia rotunda Prout, 1910
Stenalcidia sanguistellata (Schaus, 1933)
Stenalcidia sincera Schaus, 1901
Stenalcidia spilosata Dognin, 1912
Stenalcidia tristaria Schaus, 1901
Stenalcidia udeisata Bastelberger, 1908
Stenalcidia unidentifera Dyar, 1913
Stenalcidia vacillaria (Guenee, 1858)
Stenalcidia viridigrisea Bastelberger, 1909
Stenalcidia warreni Dognin, 1911

References

External links
Natural History Museum Lepidoptera genus database

Ennominae